Carberry may refer to:

Carberry (surname), includes list of notable people with the name
Carberry, Manitoba, town in Canada; site of:—
 RCAF Station Carberry, Second World War air training station 
Carberry, East Lothian, town in Scotland; site of:—
 Carberry Tower, historic house
 Battle of Carberry Hill, 1567 battle leading to the abdication of Mary, Queen of Scots

See also
 Carbery (disambiguation)